Anna Maria Horsford is an American actress, known for her performances in television comedies.

Horsford is best known for her roles as Thelma Frye on the NBC sitcom Amen (1986–91), and as Dee Baxter on the WB sitcom The Wayans Bros. (1995–99). She had dramatic roles on the FX crime drama The Shield playing A.D.A. Beth Encardi, and CBS daytime soap opera The Bold and the Beautiful as Vivienne Avant, for which she was nominated for the Daytime Emmy Award for Outstanding Special Guest Performer in a Drama Series in 2016 and Outstanding Supporting Actress in a Drama Series in 2017.

Horsford appeared in a number of movies, most notable as Craig Jones' mother Betty in 1995 comedy film Friday and its sequel Friday After Next (2002). Her other film credits include Times Square (1980), The Fan (1981), Presumed Innocent (1990), Set It Off (1996), Along Came a Spider (2001), Our Family Wedding (2010), and A Madea Christmas (2013).

Early life
Horsford was born in Harlem, New York City in 1948 to Victor Horsford, an investment real estate broker originally from the Dominican Republic, and Lillian Agatha (née Richardson) Horsford, who emigrated from Antigua and Barbuda in the 1940s. She grew up in a family of five children.

Horsford attended Wadleigh Junior High School and the High School of Performing Arts. After high school, she got into acting through the Harlem Youth for Change program.

Her first job out of high school was with the Joe Papp’s Public Theater, a part in Coriolanus at the Delacorte in Central Park.

According to a DNA analysis, she has maternal ancestry from the Limba people of Sierra Leone.

Career
Her first major role in television was as a producer for the PBS show Soul!, hosted by Ellis Haizlip, which aired between 1968 and 1973. One of her first TV appearances was in 1973 on the first run syndication game show of To Tell the Truth where she was an imposter for Laura Livingston, one of the first female military police. Horsford made guest appearances on such sitcoms as The Fresh Prince of Bel-Air, Sparks, Moesha, The Bernie Mac Show, The Shield, Girlfriends, and Everybody Hates Chris. She had main roles on the sitcoms The Wayans Bros. as "Dee Baxter" and "Thelma Frye" on Amen. She appeared on the drama Judging Amy.

More recently, she was seen in the first season of Grey's Anatomy. She returned to the big screen in the 2013 film A Madea Christmas. She portrayed Helen on the BET sitcom Reed Between the Lines.

Horsford currently has a recurring role as Vivienne Avant on The Bold and the Beautiful. For the role, she was nominated for Outstanding Special Guest Performer in a Drama Series in the 43rd Daytime Emmy Awards.

She began playing a recurring role on B Positive in the show's second-season premiere.

She also has appeared in the TBS sitcom The Last O.G. Featuring Tracy Morgan, as a recurring character (Tray's mother).

Personal life
On October 29, 2011, Horsford was awarded the title of Ambassador of Tourism of Antigua.
She is also a member of Sigma Gamma Rho sorority

Filmography

Film and TV Movies

Television

Live performances

Theater

Awards and nominations

In popular culture

Horsford has been featured on the cover of several magazines, including:

 TV Guide, August 29 – September 4, 1987, issue #1796. Cover photograph featured Sherman Hemsley and Anna Maria Horsford of NBC's Amen.
 Jet Magazine, November 23, 1987. Cast members, including Horsford, are featured on the cover. Article titled "Fun-filled Amen still one of hottest TV shows”.
 TV Guide, February 3, 1990, Four television shows are featured including Amen with photo of Horsford and Clifton Davis. Article titled "Oh, what a week! February is off with a bang."
 Jet Magazine, February 5, 1990. Cover photo and article: "Clifton Davis and Anna Maria Horsford Tie Knot on TV's Amen"
 Jet Magazine, May 13, 1991, Photo and cover article feature Clifton Davis and Horsford. Article titled "New baby and guest star James Brown climax fifth season of TV’s Amen."
 Solo Magazine, 2011 Holiday Issue. Cover photograph and article: Anna Maria Horsford: Brings the Laughs and Drama to new BET Show.

References

External links
 
 

Living people
People from Harlem
Actresses from New York City
American film actresses
American television actresses
American soap opera actresses
20th-century American actresses
21st-century American actresses
American sketch comedians
African-American actresses
American people of Sierra Leonean descent
American people of Dominican Republic descent
American people of Antigua and Barbuda descent
20th-century African-American women
20th-century African-American people
21st-century African-American women
21st-century African-American people
Year of birth missing (living people)